Academia Puerto Cabello is a Venezuelan football club based in the city of Puerto Cabello, Carabobo state and playing in the Venezuelan Primera División. It plays its home matches at the Complejo Deportivo Socialista, also known as La Bombonerita.

Current squad
As of 17 October 2022

References

External links
 Official website

Football clubs in Venezuela
Association football clubs established in 2014
2014 establishments in Venezuela
Puerto Cabello